The 1999 Akwa Ibom State gubernatorial election occurred in Nigeria on January 9, 1999. The PDP nominee Obong Victor Attah won the election, defeating the APP candidate.

Obong Victor Attah won the PDP nomination in the primary election. His running mate was Chris Ekpenyong.

Electoral system
The Governor of Akwa Ibom State is elected using the plurality voting system.

Results
PDP's Obong Victor Attah emerged winner in the contest.

The total number of registered voters in the state for the election was 1,450,367. However, 1,476,500 were previously issued voting cards in the state.

References 

Akwa Ibom State gubernatorial elections
Akwa Ibom State gubernatorial election
Akwa Ibom State gubernatorial election
Adamawa State gubernatorial election